In aviation, fleet commonality is the economic and logistic benefits of operating a standardized fleet of aircraft that share common parts, training requirements, or other characteristics.

Different types of commonality

Commonality policies may be defined in a variety of ways, depending on the operator:

 for civilian aircraft:
 By model, same generation (e.g. Boeing "Next Generation" 737-700, 737-800, and 737-900)
 By model, different generations (e.g. Boeing's "Next Generation" 737-700 and 737 MAX-7)
 By family (e.g. Boeing 737)
 Between families (e.g. deck, between Boeing 767-400ER, 777 and 737 NG)
 By manufacturer (e.g. Boeing)
 By engine (e.g. Rolls-Royce RB211)
 Any combination of the above
 for military aircraft, the same can be said:
 By model, same generation 
 By model, different generations (e.g. General Dynamics F-16A/B, multirole F-16C/D)
 By family (e.g. General Dynamics F-16)
Commonality can also be seen in engines :
 By family, same generation (e.g. RR Trent, GE T700)
 By family, different generations (e.g. CFM 56-2, -3, -5, -7 )
 Between aircraft (Pratt & Whitney's F100 with the F-15 and F-16 fleet)

Examples for civilian aircraft
Airbus and Boeing have commonality in their products within and across families.

Airbus A330 and A340 families
The A330 and A340 share many common features. The same cockpit is shared between the A330 and A340, however the A340 controls four engines instead of two on the A330. The A330 and A340 share the same wings, nose, tail and horizontal stabilizers. The A340 features an extra bogie of landing gears under the belly to support extra weight. 
The A330-300 and A340-300 share the same fuselage and wings, however with the A340-300 featuring an extra bogie of landing gears under the belly, and powered by four engines instead of two.

Boeing 757 and 767 families
The 767-400ER shares common features with the 757/767 family of airplanes, including a common pilot type rating between the 757 and 767. This allows any pilot trained to fly one model to be qualified to fly the other model with minimal additional instruction. Compatibility with the 757/767 family means that operators can gain better access to the demanding medium-size market (200-300 seats) by matching the appropriate airplane to variable requirements. They can also improve operating efficiency through lower training requirements, greater flexibility in assigning flight crews, and reduced spares inventories.

Boeing 767-400ER, 777 and 737NG
The new 767-400ER flight deck makes the airplane easier to maintain and provides flexibility for operators to tailor the flight-deck equipment to their training needs. A new instrument panel and avionics package consolidate 67 different flight deck parts to 20, simplifying 767 maintenance and improving flight crew efficiency.

On the instrument panel, the most notable change on the 767-400ER is the use of six large liquid-crystal displays in the same arrangement as the Boeing 777 and Next-Generation 737 flight decks. Pilots of these models receive similar information in a similar format. This significantly reduces training requirements to transition pilots of these other Boeing models to the 767-400ER.

Notes and references

Civil aviation
Aircraft maintenance